Laguna de Rocha (Rocha Lagoon) is an important body of water located in Rocha Department, Uruguay. The lagoon and its surroundings were declared a protected area in 1977.

References

External links
 .

Rocha
Landforms of Rocha Department
Ramsar sites in Uruguay
Birdwatching sites in Uruguay
Lagoons of South America